Graham Andrew Knowles (born 29 August 1973) is an English cricketer.  Knowles is a right-handed batsman.  He was born in Haslingden, Lancashire.

Knowles represented the Lancashire Cricket Board in List A cricket.  His debut List A match came against the Suffolk in the 2000 NatWest Trophy.  From 2000 to 2002, he represented the Board in 6 List A matches, the last of which came against Scotland in the 2nd round of the 2003 Cheltenham & Gloucester Trophy which was played in 2002.  In his 6 List A matches, he scored 126 runs at a batting average of 21.00, with a high score of 33.  In the field he took 3 catches.

He currently plays for and captains, Haslingden Cricket Club in the Lancashire League (cricket) and has over 17,000 league runs.

References

External links
Graham Knowles at Cricinfo
Graham Knowles at CricketArchive

1973 births
Living people
People from Haslingden
English cricketers
Lancashire Cricket Board cricketers